Isfahan Eastern Bypass Freeway is a freeway in Greater Isfahan Region, Isfahan, central Iran, bypassing the city of Isfahan on its eastern side. Section 1 and 2 of this Freeway was Completed in 2020 and The section 3 of freeway is currently under construction.

route 

Freeways in Iran
Transport in Isfahan
Transportation in Isfahan Province